Martina Hingis and Mary Pierce were the defending champions, but neither participated in this tournament.

Virginia Ruano Pascual and Paola Suárez won the title, defeating Jelena Dokić and Conchita Martínez in the final 6–2, 6–1. This was the first Grand Slam title for both Ruano Pascual and Suárez; they would later go on to win 8 Grand Slam Doubles titles together.

Seeds
Champion seeds are indicated in bold text while text in italics indicates the round in which those seeds were eliminated.

 Lisa Raymond /  Rennae Stubbs (semifinals)
 Virginia Ruano Pascual /  Paola Suárez (champions)
 Cara Black /  Elena Likhovtseva (third round)
 Kimberly Po-Messerli /  Nathalie Tauziat (quarterfinals)
 Serena Williams /  Venus Williams (withdrew)
 Els Callens /  Meghann Shaughnessy (third round)
 Alexandra Fusai /  Rita Grande (second round)
 Nicole Arendt /  Caroline Vis (quarterfinals)
 Martina Navratilova /  Arantxa Sánchez Vicario (first round)
 Anke Huber /  Barbara Schett (quarterfinals)
 Tathiana Garbin /  Janette Husárová (first round)
 Liezel Huber /  Laura Montalvo (second round)
 Tina Križan /  Katarina Srebotnik (first round)
 Jennifer Capriati /  Ai Sugiyama (third round)
 Nicole Pratt /  Patricia Tarabini (third round)
 Jelena Dokic /  Conchita Martínez (final)
 Amanda Coetzer /  Lori McNeil (first round)

Draw

Finals

Top half

Section 1

Section 2

Bottom half

Section 3

Section 4

External links
 Draw
2001 French Open – Women's draws and results at the International Tennis Federation

Women's Doubles
French Open - Women's Doubles
French Open by year – Women's doubles
French Open - Doubles
French Open - Doubles